Crawleyville is an unincorporated community located along the Wabash River in Wabash Township in Gibson the early 1900s, Crawleyville was an active community of farmers and fishermen.

The first settlement at Crawleyville was made in 1811.

References

Unincorporated communities in Gibson County, Indiana
Unincorporated communities in Indiana